"Run With U" is the seventh single by Japanese pop idol group Fairies, released on February 19, 2014. The song is used as the second opening for the Studio Comet and Sanrio/Sega Sammy Holdings anime series, Jewelpet Happiness, the ending for Lady Jewelpet and the commercials for Waseda Academy.

Summary
The song was first used in a Waseda Academy commercial in June 2013, featuring Ito Momoka taking on some Football players. More information about the song is confirmed in December 14, 2013, and its upcoming release as the 7th official single and will be also used as the second opening of Jewelpet Happiness. Minami Sasuga is again in charge for the choreography of the song's upcoming PV.

Track listing

CD+DVD and CD Only Editions

Charts

See also
 Jewelpet (TV series)

References

2014 singles
Anime songs
Jewelpet
2013 songs
Avex Trax singles
Fairies (Japanese group) songs
Dance-pop songs